Pedestredorcadion mokrzeckii is a species of longhorn beetle in the subfamily Lamiinae which is endemic to Ukraine. This beetle's taxonomy has been in flux and it is currently considered to be a subspecies of Dorcadion ciscaucasicum and known as Dorcadion ciscaucasicum mokrzeckii.

Description
The prothorax has the setae lifted around the midline. The outer dorsal has shoulder stripes.

References

Lamiinae
Beetles described in 1902
Endemic fauna of Ukraine
Beetles of Europe